Buzz (styled as buzz) was a British low-cost airline operating services within Europe.  It ceased operations on 31-Oct-2004. Ryanair Holdings acquired the Buzz brand in 2003 and rebranded its polish subsidiary, Ryanair Sun, as Buzz in Autumn 2019. It operated from 2000 until 2004 as a subsidiary of KLM and then Ryanair.

History 

The airline was established in 1999 and started operations on 4 January 2000. It was launched by KLM as a sub-brand of KLM uk to compete with other low-cost carriers such as EasyJet, Go Fly and Ryanair by taking over many of the point-to-point routes of the former AirUK/KLM UK network. It started with 8 BAe 146-300 aircraft transferred from the KLM uk brand which retained the Amsterdam feeder routes (transferred to KLM Cityhopper in November 2002). This was shortly followed by two leased ex-Deutsche BA Boeing 737-300 aircraft. In late 2002, buzz leased from ILFC another 6 737-300s previously operated by Continental Airlines and the first 2 737s were returned to lessor Shananda in early 2003. Buzz also was the first low-cost airline trying to attract the high yield business travel segment, especially by promoting its flights to/from London Stansted to Frankfurt (international airport) and Düsseldorf. Buzz had a local commercial manager in Germany (2000–2003) who established the first direct contacts to corporates, TM's (Travel Managers) and TMC's (Travel Management Companies).

On 31 January 2003 KLM announced its intention to sell Buzz to Ryanair for a price estimated to be in the region of €20.1 million. The sale was completed on 10 April 2003 following approval from the UK Office of Fair Trading (OFT). In addition to acquiring Buzz slots at London Stansted Airport, Ryanair acquired the leases of all 6 of the Boeing 737s and sub-leased 4 of the BAe 146s from KLM.

In order to capitalise on the acquisition and save costs, Ryanair restarted Buzz as a wholly owned subsidiary called Buzz Stansted, which retained the 10 aircraft on the UK register. Several of the original Buzz operations staff were transferred to the new organisation and an application was made for a new Air Operators Certificate (AOC). After route proving flights on 25 April 2003 an AOC was issued by the British Civil Aviation Authority on 28 April 2003 with the first revenue sectors being operated the same day.

The aircraft fleet, the majority of which retained the Buzz livery, flew several of the original Buzz routes and some Ryanair routes that had been operated by 737-200s under the Ryanair call sign. However, the BAe 146 aircraft were returned to KLM in January 2004 and the 737s continued operating the remaining routes that were not dropped following the withdrawal of the 146s.
  
In September 2004, Ryanair decided to close Buzz Stansted and flying operations ceased on 31 October 2004. The 737 aircraft were returned to ILFC and the Ryanair 737-800s took over from the Buzz aircraft. Ryanair also discontinued some of the original Buzz routes and redirected others to other airports as they were considered nearby to where existing Ryanair services operated.

2019 Revival
On 15 March 2019, Ryanair announced that they would revive the Buzz brand as the new name for Poland based Ryanair Sun.

Fleet
Before ceasing operations, the Buzz fleet consisted of the following aircraft:

See also
 Ryanair Sun
 List of defunct airlines of the United Kingdom

References

External links

 Buzz (archive)

Defunct airlines of the United Kingdom
Defunct European low-cost airlines
Airlines established in 1999
Airlines disestablished in 2004
Ryanair
Air France–KLM
1999 establishments in England
2004 disestablishments in England
British companies established in 1999
British companies disestablished in 2004